Bakan or Bakon may refer to:
 Bakan, Fars (بكان - Bakān)
 Bakan Rural District, in Fars Province